Dolichoderus superaculus is a species of ant in the genus Dolichoderus. Described by Lattke in 1987, the species is endemic to Colombia.

References

Dolichoderus
Hymenoptera of South America
Insects described in 1987